James Brian Collins (born June 11, 1958) is a former American football linebacker and National Football League Pro Bowler.

Early years
Collins graduated from West Morris Mendham High School in the Class of 1976, where, as a senior, he helped lead his high school football team to a still standing club record eight shutouts and its only state championship victory to date. He subsequently attended Syracuse University on a full athletic scholarship at linebacker. In 1980, Collins was an honorable mention All-American by the Associated Press.  He was later named to the Syracuse all-century team.

Professional career
Collins was selected in the second round (43rd overall pick) of the 1981 NFL Draft as a linebacker by the Los Angeles Rams. He was considered a leader of the Rams' defense of the mid-1980s.  He made one appearance in the Pro Bowl, with the Rams in 1985, and was a Pro Bowl alternate in 1984. Due to a shoulder injury, Collins spent the 1986 season on the injured reserve list. Overall, he played in the NFL for seven seasons with the Rams (1981–1985, 1987–1988), and then spent one season with the San Diego Chargers (1989).

Collins also appeared in the 1986 Rams promotional video, Let's Ram It, where he goes by the nickname "Babyface" and refers to himself as a "tacklin' fool on the football field."

References

1958 births
American football linebackers
Living people
Los Angeles Rams players
National Conference Pro Bowl players
Sportspeople from Morris County, New Jersey
People from Orange, New Jersey
Players of American football from New Jersey
San Diego Chargers players
Syracuse Orange football players
West Morris Mendham High School alumni